This is a list of films produced in the Tollywood Telugu language film industry ordered by year of release in the 1980s.

1980s



1980s
Lists of 1980s films
Telugu films

te:తెలుగు సినిమాలు